Karaidelsky District (Qariźel rayonı; , Qaraidel rayonı) is an administrative and municipal district (raion), one of the fifty-four in the Republic of Bashkortostan, Russia. It is located in the north of the republic and borders with Askinsky District in the north, Duvansky District in the east, Nurimanovsky and Blagoveshchensky Districts in the south, Mishkinsky District in the southwest, and with Baltachevsky District in the west. Its administrative center is the rural locality (a selo) of Karaidel. As of the 2010 Census, the total population of the district was 27,945, with the population of Karaidel accounting for 21.4% of that number.

History
The district was established in February 1932.

Administrative and municipal status
Within the framework of administrative divisions, Karaidelsky District is one of the fifty-four in the Republic of Bashkortostan. The district is divided into seventeen selsoviets, comprising ninety-nine rural localities. As a municipal division, the district is incorporated as Karaidelsky Municipal District. Its seventeen selsoviets are incorporated as seventeen rural settlements within the municipal district. The selo of Karaidel serves as the administrative center of both the administrative and municipal district.

References

Notes

Sources

Districts of Bashkortostan
States and territories established in 1932
 
